The 1975–76 Kansas City Scouts season was the second, and final season for the NHL franchise in Kansas City, Missouri.  They played their home games at  Kemper Arena.  The Scouts started the season by going 11–21–4 in their first 36 games, but after their December 28 win against the California Golden Seals, the Scouts would win only once in their final 44 games going 1-35-8, to finish with a record of 12 wins, 56 losses, and 12 ties (for a season-ending total of 36 points).

The last four games the Scouts ever played took place in Japan. Following the conclusion of the 1975-76 regular season, Kansas City and Washington participated in an exhibition series with the first two games played in Sapporo (site of the 1972 Winter Olympics), the third and fourth in Tokyo at Yoyogi National Gymnasium, site of the swimming and diving competition at the 1964 Summer Olympics. The Capitals won the first three contests. On April 18, 1976, the Scouts defeated Washington 4-2. Thus, Kansas City won its final game but it did not count in the NHL standings. (Icing On The Plains: The Rough Ride of Kansas City's NHL Scouts, Troy Treasure, Balboa Press)

During late July 1976, the Scouts left Kansas City for Denver to become the Colorado Rockies ending their two-year stint in Kansas City.

Offseason

Regular season

Final standings

Game log

Playoffs

Player stats

Regular season
Scoring

Goaltending

Note: GP = Games played; G = Goals; A = Assists; Pts = Points; +/- = Plus/minus; PIM = Penalty minutes; PPG=Power-play goals; SHG=Short-handed goals; GWG=Game-winning goals
      MIN=Minutes played; W = Wins; L = Losses; T = Ties; GA = Goals against; GAA = Goals against average; SO = Shutouts;

Awards and records

Transactions

Trades

Waivers

Draft picks
Kansas City's draft picks at the 1975 NHL Amateur Draft held in Montreal, Quebec.

Farm teams

Kansas City's International Hockey League affiliate was the Port Huron Flags. During the course of the 1975-76 season, the Scouts assigned players to the American Hockey League's Springfield Indians.

See also
 1975–76 NHL season

References

 
 Scouts on Hockey Database
 Scouts on Database Hockey
 Scouts Game Log on Database Hockey

Kansas City Scouts seasons
Kansas
Kansas
1975 in Missouri
1976 in Missouri